The Women's Land Army was a British civilian organisation recreated in 1939. It was first created during World War I so women could work in agriculture. 

Women's Land Army may also refer to:
 Women's Land Army (World War I)
 Women's Land Army of America
 Australian Women's Land Army
 New Zealand Women's Land Army